Silas Seandel (born August 11, 1937, New York City) is a furniture sculptor based in New York City.

Seandel studied sculpture and economics at the University of Pennsylvania.  He graduated in 1950 and opened a studio in 1963, and for over 40 years has commissioned creative pieces of functional art, or sculptured furniture.

Seandel has been profiled by a number of publications during his career, including Interior Design magazine in 1982 (Vol. 53, Issue 12) and Hudson Magazine in 2008 (Vol. 4 Issue 1, 2008).  He was also profiled in a chapter of Modern Americana: Studio Furniture From High Craft to High Glam by Julies Iovine and Todd Merill (Rizzoli 2008), describing him as one of the premier metal sculptors in the United States in the late 20th century.

Seandel's works are all handmade in his studio located in the Chelsea neighborhood of Manhattan.  He uses solid metals such as brass, bronze, steel, copper, etc.  There are no enamels, no veneers, or unnatural materials, and all colors are the results of acids and heat treatments which Seandel has developed.

References

External links 
 
 Interior Design article spotlighting Silas Seandel Studio.
  Silas Seandel, spotlighted artist in published book,  "Modern Americana: Studio Furniture From High Craft to High Glam" (2008: Rizzoli)
  Design website listing of Silas's work

Living people
1937 births
University of Pennsylvania alumni
American furniture makers
Artists from New York City
Sculptors from New York (state)